Khoi Alexander Young (born December 31, 2002) is an American artistic gymnast.  He is a member of the United States men's national gymnastics team and currently competing in collegiate gymnastics for Stanford.

Personal life 
Young was born in Bowie, Maryland on December 31, 2002, to Kevin and Lucille Young.  He has two siblings.

Gymnastics career

2019 
Young competed at the 2019 Winter Cup where he placed 7th in the all-around but won gold on floor exercise and silver on vault.  In May Young was selected at the alternate for the inaugural Junior World Championships.

In August Young competed at the U.S. National Championships in the 15-16 age division where he finished 5th in the all-around.  He won gold on pommel horse, silver on floor exercise, and bronze on parallel bars.

2020–21 
In early 2020 Young competed at the RD761 Gymnastics Invitational where he helped team USA win silver behind Japan.  Individually Young won silver in the all-around behind Motomu Yoshida and picked up three additional medals during event finals.  He next competed at the Winter Cup where he finished 18th in the all-around.  The remainder of the competitive season was cancelled due to the global COVID-19 pandemic.

Young returned to competition at the 2021 Winter Cup where he finished third on vault and fifth on pommel horse.  At the 2021 National Championships Young placed 22nd in the all-around.

2022 
Young began competing for the Stanford Cardinal in the 2021–2022 season.  He competed at the 2022 Winter Cup where he placed second in the all-around behind Vitaliy Guimaraes.  During event finals he won gold on pommel horse and silver on vault behind Asher Hong.  As a result Young was selected to represent the USA at the DTB Pokal Team Challenge in Stuttgart alongside Guimaraes, Hong, Brody Malone, and Yul Moldauer.  At the NCAA Championship Young helped Stanford defend their national title.  Additionally he placed second on vault behind Paul Juda.

In late July Young competed at the U.S. Classic where he placed fourth in the all-around.

Competitive history

References

External links
 
 

2002 births
Living people
People from Bowie, Maryland
American male artistic gymnasts
Stanford Cardinal men's gymnasts